Trevor Briggs (birth registered third ¼ 1946 – 3 October 2013) was an English professional rugby league, and amateur rugby union footballer who played in the 1960s and 1970s.

Background
Trevor Briggs birth was registered in Leeds district, West Riding of Yorkshire, England, he worked as a police officer, and he died aged 67, his funeral service took place at Kippax Parish Church, Church Lane, Kippax at 12.30pm on Wednesday 23 October 2013, his committal took place at Pontefract Crematorium, Wakefield Road, Pontefract at 2.00pm, followed by a reception at Kings Croft Hotel, Wakefield Road, Pontefract.

Playing career

Challenge Cup Final appearances
Trevor Briggs played , i.e. number 2, in Castleford’s 11-6 victory over Salford in the 1969 Challenge Cup Final during the 1968–69 season at Wembley Stadium, London on Saturday 17 May 1969, in front of a crowd of 97,939, and played  in the 7-2 victory over Wigan in the 1970 Challenge Cup Final during the 1969–70 season at Wembley Stadium, London on Saturday 9 May 1970, in front of a crowd of 95,255.

BBC2 Floodlit Trophy Final appearances
Trevor Briggs played , i.e. number 5, in Castleford's 4-0 victory over St. Helens in the 1965 BBC2 Floodlit Trophy Final during the 1965–66 season at Knowsley Road, St. Helens on Tuesday 14 December 1965.

Player's No.6 Trophy Final appearances
Trevor Briggs played , i.e. number 5, and was voted the Player's No.6 Winner in Castleford's 25-15 victory over Blackpool Borough in the 1976–77 Player's No.6 Trophy Final during the 1976–77 season at The Willows, Salford on Saturday 22 January 1977.

References

External links
Search for "Briggs" at rugbyleagueproject.org
Trevor Briggs Passes Away
Former Castleford winger Trevor Briggs has died aged 67
Castleford says farewell to a legend, Trevor Briggs
Trevor Briggs Funeral
Trevor Briggs Memory Box Search at archive.castigersheritage.com

1946 births
2013 deaths
Castleford R.U.F.C. players
Castleford Tigers captains
Castleford Tigers players
English rugby league players
English rugby union players
People from Kippax, West Yorkshire
British police officers
Rugby league fullbacks
Rugby league wingers
Rugby league players from Leeds
Rugby union players from Leeds